The Battle of Gela may refer to:
Battle of Gela (405 BC)
Battle of Gela (1943)